Harar-e Kalgah-e Shiraz (also Romanized as Ḩarār-e Kalgāh-e Shīrāz; also known as Ḩarāreh Kalgāh-e Shīrāz) is a village in Bakesh-e Yek Rural District, in the Central District of Mamasani County, Fars Province, Iran. At the 2006 census, its population was 22, in 7 families.

References 

Populated places in Mamasani County